Zechariah McPhearson (born March 21, 1998) is an American football cornerback for the Philadelphia Eagles of the National Football League (NFL). He played college football at Texas Tech.

Early life and education
Zech McPhearson was born on March 21, 1998, in Baltimore, Maryland. He went to Riverdale Baptist High School. He went to two colleges, Penn State University and Texas Tech University. After two seasons with Penn State where he played a combined 9 games, and had 14 tackles, he transferred to Texas Tech. With the Red Raiders, he played and started all 12 games in his junior year. He had 51 tackles (42 solo) with them that year. He also had two blocked kicks. In his senior season, he appeared in all 10 games, starting 9, and had 53 tackles. He had at least two tackles in all 10 games and had four interceptions in the season. He was named First-team All-Big 12 by the conference coaches, Associated Press and the Phil Steele Magazine. He was named third-team All-American by Pro Football Focus and was named First-team All-Texas by Dave Campbell's Texas Football.

Professional career 

McPhearson was drafted in the fourth round with the 123rd pick in the 2021 NFL Draft by the Philadelphia Eagles. He signed his four-year rookie contract with Philadelphia on June 3, 2021.

In Week 1 of the 2022 season, McPhearson was named NFC Special Teams Player of the Week, after he made 2 special teams tackles and recovered a surprise onside kick attempt in a 38–35 win over the Detroit Lions. He is the first Eagle to receive the award since Jake Elliott in 2021.

Personal life 
McPhearson's family has a history of playing sports. His father, Gerrick, earned a tryout for the New England Patriots as a defensive back in 1988, and his mother, Kim, played in the National Women's Football League. His older brother Gerrick played for the New York Giants. His older brother Derrick played football at the University of Illinois, then spend some time with the Milwaukee Brewers organization. Emmanuel played football at the University of New Mexico. Jeremiah played at IUP. Joshua played football at Penn State. Matthew was a 4th round draft pick out of high school to the Arizona Diamondback organization.  His sister Kimberly plays collegiate soccer.

References

External links
Penn State bio

See also
Gerrick McPhearson

Living people
1998 births
Sportspeople from the Baltimore metropolitan area
Texas Tech Red Raiders football players
People from Columbia, Maryland
Philadelphia Eagles players
Players of American football from Maryland
Penn State Nittany Lions football players
American football cornerbacks